A women-only space is an area where only women (and in some cases children) are allowed, thus providing a place where they do not have to interact with men. Historically and globally, many cultures had, and many still have, some form of female seclusion.

Purpose and background
Women-only spaces are a form of sex segregation, and practices such as women-only public toilets, women-only passenger cars on public transport or women's parking spaces may be described using both terms. They are sometimes referred to as "safe spaces".

These spaces do not go without challenge. Men's rights activists have launched lawsuits to gain access to female-only spaces, as for example Stopps v Just Ladies Fitness (Metrotown) Ltd, regarding a gym in Canada. The access of trans women, regardless of their legal gender, is also sometimes contentious, both from an ethical and from a legal perspective. In some cases questions have been raised about the value and legitimacy of particular spaces being reserved for women.

Women's quarters and segregated societies 
Many cultures have had a tradition of a separate living space for the women of a household ("women's quarters"); this becomes more elaborate the larger the house is, reaching its peak in royal palaces. The best known example is probably the harem, a Turkish word, but similar systems existed elsewhere, and still do, in some places.
Andaruni (in traditional Persian residential architecture in what is now Iran)
Seraglio (Ottoman Empire)
Zenana (South Asia) - hence, Zenana missions, providing medical and educational support to segregated women
Purdah (South Asia)
Terem (Russia)
Ōoku (Japan)
Gynaeceum (Ancient Greece)
Anthapura or Antahpura (India)

Some societies segregate most public facilities by sex, according to their interpretation of Islam and gender segregation; critics calls this gender apartheid after the former South African system of racial division. The best known examples are Saudi Arabia (Women's rights in Saudi Arabia#Sex segregation) and Iran (Sex segregation in Iran, Women's rights in Iran). More disputed regimes include Afghanistan (Taliban treatment of women) and Islamic State of Iraq and the Levant (ISIS).

History
The rise of first wave feminism, including the long struggles for the vote (suffrage) – for access to education and the professions (in English-speaking societies), led to various initiatives to widen women's possibilities.

 In the 1910s and 1920s, there was widespread encouragement in the United States for the establishment of ladies' lounges and rest rooms to accommodate rural women who traveled into county seats and market towns to conduct business. The Ladies Rest Room in Lewisburg, Tennessee, may be the last free-standing one in that state still in use.
A ladies' ordinary was a women-only dining space which started to appear in North American hotels and restaurants from 1830, when it was socially unacceptable for women to dine in public without a male escort.
 In 1929 Virginia Woolf published an influential essay entitled "A Room of One's Own".

Examples

Locations, venues, and activities may allow men at certain times of the day, week, or year; for example, public baths that have some days for women and some for men. Some allow children, either girls only or both sexes. Some establishments allow men and women in areas that are physically set apart from each other. Some exist temporarily (e.g. renting space for a few hours or days).

Businesses and services
Women-only bank
See also the kitty party, an informal savings club
 Of this international list of women's organizations, some have their own premises; others such as the Women's Institute offer their members a women-only space for the duration of the meeting
Community centres focusing on women, such as The Women's Building in San Francisco and Pankhurst Centre in Manchester
Sex shops catering to women, such as Sh! Women's Erotic Emporium
Feminist bookstores may have women-only and mixed-sex times
Women-only amusement parks
Resorts such as SuperShe Island
Spas (see also section on public bathing, below)

Gyms
The Young Women's Christian Association (YWCA), now a global movement for education and human rights, was for many decades best known for its hostels and fitness centres, see List of YWCA buildings
Other chains or stand-alone gyms choose to cater to females, e.g.Total Woman

Hotels and other accommodation
 some offer women-only floors
others are the entire business (e.g. the "urban retreat" and spa the Luthan Hotel in Riyadh and Som Dona in the holiday resort of Majorca)
capsule hotels in Japan
residential hotels offered accommodation for months and in some cases years, particularly to unmarried young women
Barbizon Hotel for Women, which opened in 1927 in Manhattan, was not the first but possibly the most famous example, described in the 2021 book The Barbizon: The Hotel That Set Women Free
purpose-built long-term bed-sit accommodation for single working women
e.g. those blocks built in the 1920s by the Lady Workers' Homes Limited on the Holly Lodge Estate in Highgate, north London. 
 Sorority house, for college students

Transportation 

Women's parking space
Pink rickshaw
 Women-only passenger car
on a subway: Egypt, Indonesia, India, Iran, Japan, UAE (Rush Hour), Brazil, Malaysia, Mexico, Philippines
 buses : Bangladesh, China, India, Iran, Malaysia, Morocco, Nepal, Pakistan, Papua New Guinea, UAE
 taxis : Egypt (Cairo), India (Kerala), Pakistan (Karachi), UAE (Dubai)

Women's clubs
that have or had their own premises (parallel to a gentlemen's club), and more recently women-only restaurants and networking events
see List of women's club buildings as part of the US Woman's club movement

Celebrations 
Many celebrations, especially around rites of passage, are marked by a girl or woman and her female relatives and friends. For example, many cultures have a party before the wedding for the bride, in Western culture known as a hen night or bachelorette party. Parties for a pregnant woman are baby showers, usually attended by female friends and family.

Changing rooms

Places to change one's clothes, for example for leisure (at the gym, swimming pool, or beach), or for work (locker rooms at factories and hospitals), or while shopping (department store fitting rooms), are usually single-sex. Some have individual cubicles, while others provide only communal facilities, e.g. an open space with benches and lockers.

Cultural events
Michigan Womyn's Music Festival (closed after 40th anniversary in 2015)
Nyansapo Festival, an Afro-feminist festival in Paris in 2017
Mountain Moving Coffeehouse, a weekly music night in Chicago (1974-2005)
Race for Life, a British charity event that raises money for cancer
Marches to protest and celebrate, such as Take Back the Night and the Dyke March
Yamurikuma, a gender role reversal festival of some Xingu tribes
The Fainting Club, a supper club described as an old boys' club for girls

There are many other festivals, conferences, etc. that focus on women's achievements and women's issues, but allow anyone to attend, from the Rochester Women's Rights Convention of 1848 to today's Women of the World Festival.

Education
 Girls' schools, i.e. single-sex education, see also :Category:Girls' schools
Women's colleges and universities
Finishing school
Sororities

When formal education was banned by the Taliban, underground schools sprung up, such as the Golden Needle Sewing School for writers to secretly discuss their work.

Health care
Historically, some health care services for women (particularly around childbirth) were staffed by women. As women gained increased access to education in the late nineteenth century, hospitals hired female physicians for female patients; nurses by this point were almost exclusively female.

Elizabeth Garrett Anderson and Obstetric Hospital is named after one of Britain's first female physicians
London School of Medicine for Women, the first medical school to train women as doctors

During second-wave feminism, health activists set up feminist health centers, particularly in the United States. Some places are for women from one background, such as the Native American Women's Health Education Resource Center. Some holistic care centres are for mothers and their children, such as Nkosi's Haven in South Africa.

Land and shelter 

Womyn's land, stemming from separatist feminism of the 1970s, e.g. Amazon Acres in Australia
A precursor to this is the Woman's Commonwealth, founded in Texas in the late 1870s by a women's bible study group
 Anti-war activism such as Greenham Common Women's Peace Camp in the UK and Seneca Women's Encampment for a Future of Peace and Justice in the US
Umoja, Kenya, a village of women and children fleeing domestic violence
Jinwar, Syria, a village for women without a husband and their children
Women's shelter, a place of temporary accommodation for women fleeing domestic violence, e.g. Vancouver Rape Relief & Women's Shelter
 Some homeless shelters are just for women, e.g. Rosie's Place
 Most rape crisis centers

Lesbian services
 Cruises and vacation resorts such as those operated by Olivia Travel
 Lesbian bars such as the now-closed Candy Bar in London and the now-closed The Lexington Club in San Francisco
 June L. Mazer Lesbian Archives
 Lesbian Connection network forum
 Lesbian Herstory Archives

Menstruation 

Some menstrual taboos require a woman to stay at home, or avoid certain places such as temples, but other cultures assign a particular place to segregate herself from her community, for example the chhaupadi (menstrual huts) of Nepal today, or The Red Tent, a fictionalised version of Old Testament-era customs.  The anthropologist Wynne Maggi describes the communal bashali (large menstrual house) of women in the Kalasha Valley (northwestern Pakistan) as their 'most holy place', respected by men and serving as women's all-female organizing centre for establishing and maintaining gender solidarity and power.

The seclusion of girls at puberty (i.e. menarche) is another such custom.

Military, policing, and prisons
Some countries operate or operated separate services for women, such as the UK's Women's Royal Air Force, see :Category:All-female military units and formations
Women's police station
 The incarceration of women is in most countries in single-sex prisons, or female-only wings within larger men's prisons, see :Category:Women's prisons

Motherhood and lactation
The lactation room is a modern, mostly American phenomenon, designed for using electric breast pumps and refrigerating the expressed milk. In many countries, spaces for women to nurse their babies can be known as breastfeeding rooms or nursing areas. The period of postpartum confinement was traditionally a time for new mothers to learn to care for their infant from older and more experienced women.

Places to wash and swim

Public nudity is in many cultures restricted to single-sex groups.  Public baths may separate men and women by time or by space.
Turkish bath, hammam, see especially its function as a gendered social space
Mikveh, the Jewish ritual bath

Specific examples include:
Frauenbad Stadthausquai, a public bath built in Switzerland in the late 19th century for women, and which still operates as such
Hampstead Heath Ladies' Pond, a reservoir in a London park
McIver Women's Baths, also known as McIver Ladies' Baths, in New South Wales, Australia. It is a council-owned, late C19 heritage structure.
La Femme (beach), Egypt

In many cultures, laundry was seen as "women's work", so the village wash-house (lavoir) acted as a space for women to gather and talk together as they washed clothes.

Religious festivals 
Attukal Pongala- Hindu festival in Kerala, India
Thesmophoria in Ancient Greece
Jivitputrika
Karva Chauth, celebrated by Hindu women in Northern India

Religious places
Women's mosques, which have existed for centuries in China; in the 21st century, new examples have been created around the world
More generally, the women's space in most mosques, see Gender separation in mosques
Gender separation in Judaism, as for example the mechitza used to demarcate women's space in a synagogue
Convent, the home of Christian nuns
Double monastery, with separate space for monks (men) and nuns (women)
Beguinage, all-women accommodation in the Low Countries (Belgium and the Netherlands)

Sports

Many amateur and most professional sports are segregated by sex.

Toilets 

In almost all countries, public toilets are segregated by sex.

See also

Radical feminism
Right to privacy
Voyeurism
Womyn
Womyn-born womyn
Separate spheres

:Category:Lesbian events
:Category:Sex segregation
:Category:Women's conferences
:Category:Women's organizations
:Category:Women's events
:Category:Women's festivals
:Category:Women's marches

References

Further reading

External links
 Women-only space
 Respect women's-only space
 Exploring the Value of Women-Only Space
 Women-Only Spaces: An Alternative To Patriarchy 

Feminist terminology
Sex segregation
 
Women-related neologisms